The Thiaroye massacre was a massacre of French West African veterans of the 1940 Battle of France, by French forces on the morning of 1 December 1944. These Tirailleurs Sénégalais units had been recently liberated from prisoner camps and after being repatriated to West Africa, they mutinied against poor conditions and defaulted pay at the Thiaroye military camp, on the outskirts of Dakar, Senegal. Between 35 and over 400 people were killed.

Background

During the Battle of France, around 120,000 soldiers from the French colonies were captured by the German forces. Most of these troops came from the French North African possessions, while around 20 percent were from French West Africa. Influenced by Nazi racial ideology, German troops summarily killed between 1,000 and 1,500 black prisoners in May and June 1940.

Although they kept colonial troops in France on the pretext of preventing the spread of tropical diseases, the Germans also wanted to prevent the "racial defilement" (Rassenschande) of German women outlawed by the Nuremberg Laws of 1935.

Following the Allied landings in Normandy in June 1944, the African troops interned in these Frontstalags prisoners camps all over France were liberated by advancing Allied troops and subsequently repatriated to French West Africa. 

On 5 November, a group of 1,635 of these former prisoners of war embarked in Morlaix on the British ship Circassia. They landed in Dakar on 21 November and were temporarily assigned to the military camp of Thiaroye.

Ever since their liberation, discontent had been growing among the former prisoners. The utter disorganization of French authorities had led to several delays concerning their repatriation. More importantly, they had not yet received their demobilization benefits and only a 1,500 francs advance had been awarded to them before they had embarked. Other matters of contention included the exchange rates between the Metropolitan French franc and the local colonial franc, as well as issues regarding savings made during their internment and their right to demobilization clothes.  

On 25 November, a group that was supposed to depart for Bamako on that same day refused to leave Thiaroye until the matter was settled. This act of disobedience prompted Brigadier general Marcel Dagnan to visit the camp on 28 November. During his visit, Dagnan was shocked by the hostility he encountered. His car was damaged, and he claimed he had been close to being taken hostage by the men. He declared the camp in open mutiny and decided to make a show of force to bring it back under his authority.

Suppression
On the morning of 1 December at 6:30 AM, three companies of the 1st Regiment of Senegalese Tirailleurs and the 7th Regiment of Senegalese Tirailleurs, backed by elements from local National Gendarmerie units, elements from the 6th Regiment of Colonial Artillery and one M3 Stuart light tank, entered the military camp in an attempt to end the rebellion.

According to official reports, at around 7:30 one of the mutineers pulled a knife, but was soon disarmed. At around 8:45, a gun shot was heard, but claimed no victim. 

The deadly confrontation occurred around 9:30 AM. Accounts vary regarding what ignited the gunfight. According to some versions, it began when one of the mutineers opened fire from one of the barracks, while other versions put the blame on a warning shot fired by a soldier of the repression force to intimidate the mutineers.

In any case, a fusillade ensued, which, though it lasted for less than a minute, killed and wounded at least several dozens among the mutineers, and wounded three men among the forces sent to repress the mutiny.
The official report of December 2 states that 24 of the mutineers were killed outright and 45 were wounded, 11 of which subsequently died of their wounds. A report by Dagnan on December 5 however speaks of 24 killed outright and 46 who later died of their wounds at the hospital, thus totaling 70 death. According to an article published in Al Jazeera on 22 November 2013, some veterans would have later claimed that the death toll actually reached as high as 300 dead.

Aftermath
The following year, 34 of the mutineers, who were thought to be the instigators of the insurrection, were tried and given sentences  ranging from one to ten years of prison. They were later pardoned as French President Vincent Auriol visited Senegal in March 1947, but they were not exonerated, and the widows of the fallen mutineers of 1944 were never awarded the veteran pensions usually granted to widows of fallen soldiers.
After the war ended, the French argued that the tirailleurs were particularly prone to revolt. The French have based this claim on the notion that German soldiers, in an attempt to undermine the loyalty of France’s colonial subjects in Africa, had given the tirailleurs favored treatment as prisoners of war. This ostensibly good treatment of tirailleurs in prisoner of war camps was not, however, based in fact. 

Furthermore, there is no mention of the Thiaroye Massacre in any of France's history books taught in school.  Despite the complications of the massacre, France still currently has strong political and military connections with Senegal, which could explain why the film Camp de Thiaroye (1988) was so poorly received and censored in France. A new generation of French leadership wants to confront the past and even planned to build an exhibition about the incident, which would travel to former French colonies in Western Africa in 2013. While the incident is merely mentioned, there is a military cemetery in Senegal that is unkept and receives no visitors. The cemetery holds the unmarked mass graves of the fallen Senegalese soldiers. The Senegalese army prevents any film or photography of the cemetery, and many locals consider the cemetery to be haunted due to the fallen Senegalese soldiers still awaiting the vengeance of their honor.

In art and literature

Senegalese author and filmmaker Ousmane Sembène directed a film, Camp de Thiaroye (1988), documenting the events leading up to the Thiaroye massacre, as well as the massacre itself. The film is considered historical fiction, as the characters are not necessarily based on actual tirailleurs who were killed. The film received positive reviews at the time it was released and continues to be heralded by scholars as important historical documentation of the Thiaroye massacre. The movie was banned in France for over a decade.

Guinean writer Fodéba Keïta wrote and staged the narrative poem Aube africaine ("African Dawn", 1957) as a theatre-ballet based on the massacre. In African Dawn, a young man called Naman complies with the French colonial rulers by fighting in the French Army only to be killed in Thiaroye. His works were banned in French Africa as he was considered radical and anticolonial.

Senegalese poet Léopold Sédar Senghor wrote the poem Thiaroye as a tribute to the victims of the Thiaroye massacre.

References

Bibliography
 Myron Echenberg, "Tragedy at Thiaroye: The Senegalese Soldiers' Uprising of 1944 ", in Peter Gutkind, Robin Cohen and Jean Copans (eds), African Labor History, Beverly Hills, 1978, p. 109-128 
 Boubacar Boris Diop, Thiaroye terre rouge, in Le Temps de Tamango, L'Harmattan, 1981
 Ousmane Sembène, Camp de Thiaroye, Feature Film, Color, 1988, 147min.

External links
 « 1er décembre 1944 : le massacre du camp de Thiaroye » (article de Hervé Mbouguen, 23 octobre 2003)
 Camp de Thiaroye (extrait vidéo sur le site de la Médiathèque des Trois Mondes)

Massacres in 1944
November 1944 events
December 1944 events
African resistance to colonialism
History of Senegal
French West Africa
1944 in French West Africa
Mass murder in 1944
Resistance to the French colonial empire
Military discipline and World War II
World War II massacres
Military history of France during World War II
Massacres committed by France
Mutinies
Massacres in Africa